Taking Stock is a 1970 novel by Yury Trifonov. It is the second volume of his Moscow quintet.

References

1970 novels
Novels by Yury Trifonov